Geographic atrophy (GA), also known as atrophic age-related macular degeneration (AMD) or advanced dry AMD, is an advanced form of age-related macular degeneration that can result in the progressive and irreversible loss of retinal tissue (photoreceptors, retinal pigment epithelium, choriocappillaris) which can lead to a loss of visual function over time. It is estimated that GA affects >5 million people worldwide and approximately 1 million patients in the US, which is similar to the prevalence of neovascular (wet) AMD, the other advanced form of the disease.

The incidence of advanced AMD, both geographic atrophy and neovascular AMD, increases exponentially with age and while there are therapies for wet AMD, GA currently has no approved treatment options. The aim of most current clinical trials is to reduce the progression of GA lesion enlargement.

Presentation
Geographic atrophy is a chronic disease, which leads to visual function loss. This often results in difficulties performing daily tasks such as reading, recognizing faces, and driving, and ultimately has severe consequences on independence.

Initially, patients often have good visual acuity if the GA lesions are not involved in the central macular, or foveal, region of the retina. As such, a standard vision test may underrepresent the visual deficit experienced by patients who report challenges reading, driving or seeing in low light conditions. Reading speed is often initially unaffected due to foveal sparing, but worsens progressively as the area of atrophy enlarges. As the disease progresses, vision-related quality-of-life declines markedly.

While fluorescein angiography and optical coherence tomography are today well established for diagnosing and tracking progression in geographic atrophy more complex diagnostic assessments may be required in the context of clinical trials.
https://en.wikipedia.org/wiki/Pegcetacoplan

Pathogenesis
The pathogenesis of GA is not fully understood yet. It is likely multifactorial and triggered by intrinsic and extrinsic stressors of the poorly regenerative retinal pigment epithelium (RPE), particularly oxidative stress caused by the high metabolic demand of photoreceptors, photo-oxidation, and environmental stressors such as cigarette smoke.  Variations in several genes, particularly in the complement system, increase the risk of developing GA.  This is an active area of research but the current hypothesis is that with aging, damage caused by these stressors accumulates, which coupled with a genetic predisposition, results in the appearance of drusen and lipofuscin deposits (early and intermediate AMD). These and other products of oxidative stress can trigger inflammation via multiple pathways, particularly the complement cascade, ultimately leading to loss of photoreceptors, RPE, and choriocapillaris, culminating in atrophic lesions that grow over time.

Risk factors for GA progression
A plethora of in vivo risk factors for GA progression have been published and validated.

Recent studies indicate that geographic atrophy may be due to deficiencies in blood flow within the choriocapillaris. These studies used swept-source optical coherence tomography angiography to examine the choriocapillaris. Using imaging algorithms, they then determined which regions of the choriocapillaris had deficient blood flow, thus creating a heat map of the blood supply to the retinal pigment epithelium. They went on to use fundus autofluorescence to image the retinal pigment epithelium over the course of a year, this allowed them to map out the direction and magnitude with the geographic atrophy spread. They then found that regions of the choriocapillaris which had less blood flow were more likely to degenerate and become geographic atrophy. Since the choriocapillaris is the main blood supply of the retinal pigment epithelium, it is leading some to believe that geographic atrophy is primarily an ischemic disease (disease due to decreased blood flow).

It was also shown that non-exudative neovascular membranes, which can recapitulate the choriocapillaris, are associated with a markedly slower GA progression. This further supports the vascular insufficiency hypothesis.

Diagnosis
Diagnosis of geographic atrophy is made by an ophthalmologist in the clinic. Fundus autofluorescence and optical coherence tomography angiography are imaging modalities that can be used in the diagnosis. While fundus autofluorescence is the standard modality for viewing geographic atrophy, optical coherence tomography can offer unique benefits. Optical coherence tomography angiography can help the physician see if there is any subretinal fluid in the eye. This is useful because it could indicate that the patient may be developing wet AMD. Since patients with geographic atrophy are at higher risk for developing advanced wet AMD (neovascular AMD), this could be especially useful in the monitoring of patients with geography atrophy. If signs of neovascular AMD found, the physician can initiate treatment of wet age-related macular degeneration.

Quantification of GA progression
Traditionally, GA progression is quantified in terms of the area of retinal pigment epithelium atrophy. Multiple imaging methods can be applied to quantify this area of retinal pigment epithelium atrophy including short-wavelength (blue) fundus autofluorescence imaging, green fundus autofluorescence imaging, and en face optical coherence tomography imaging.

However, more recent data suggest that photoreceptor degeneration is not limited to the area of retinal pigment epithelium atrophy, but extends beyond this area. These more subtle changes can be quantified by volumetric analyses of optical coherence tomography data.

Treatment
There are currently no approved treatments to reverse or halt the progression of geographic atrophy.
https://en.wikipedia.org/wiki/Pegcetacoplan Cases should be regularly followed by an ophthalmologist so that if patients develop neovascular AMD, they can be treated for that.

References 

Eye diseases
Disorders of choroid and retina